The 2017 ABN AMRO World Tennis Tournament (or Rotterdam Open) was a men's tennis tournament played on indoor hard courts. It took place at the Rotterdam Ahoy arena in the Dutch city of Rotterdam, between 13 and 19 February 2017. It was the 44th edition of the tournament, and part of the ATP World Tour 500 series of the 2017 ATP World Tour.

Points and prize money

Point distribution

Prize money 

1 Qualifiers prize money is also the Round of 32 prize money
* per team

Singles main-draw entrants

Seeds 

1 Rankings as of February 6, 2017.

Other entrants 
The following players received wildcards into the main draw:
  Tallon Griekspoor
  Robin Haase
  Stefanos Tsitsipas

The following players received entry from the qualifying draw:
  Aljaž Bedene
  Marius Copil
  Evgeny Donskoy
  Pierre-Hugues Herbert

The following player received entry as a lucky loser:
  Denis Istomin

Withdrawals 
Before the tournament
  Marcos Baghdatis →replaced by  Borna Ćorić
  Roberto Bautista Agut →replaced by  Denis Istomin
  Rafael Nadal →replaced by  Florian Mayer
  Stan Wawrinka (knee injury) →replaced by  Benoît Paire

Doubles main-draw entrants

Seeds 

1 Rankings are as of February 6, 2017.

Other entrants 
The following pairs received wildcards into the main draw:
  Robin Haase /  Glenn Smits
  Wesley Koolhof /  Matwé Middelkoop

The following pair received entry from the qualifying draw:
  Tallon Griekspoor /  Niels Lootsma

Finals

Singles 

  Jo-Wilfried Tsonga defeated  David Goffin, 4–6, 6–4, 6–1

Doubles 

  Ivan Dodig /  Marcel Granollers defeated  Wesley Koolhof /  Matwé Middelkoop, 7–6(7–5), 6–3

References

External links